The Destroyer is a fictional magical character appearing in American comic books published by Marvel Comics. Usually depicted as an opponent of the Thunder God and hero Thor, it is in fact a suit of Asgardian armor created and animated by magic. The character first appears in Journey into Mystery #118 (Jul. 1965) and was created by Stan Lee and Jack Kirby.

Debuting in the Silver Age of Comic Books, the Destroyer is featured in over four decades of Marvel continuity and other Marvel-endorsed products such as animated television series, live-action films, video games, and merchandise such as action figures and trading cards. Due to trademark issues, at least one toy version of this character is marketed as Marvel's Destroyer. The Destroyer appears in the 2011 live-action film Thor.

Fictional history
The Destroyer is an enchanted suit of armor forged by the King of the Norse gods, Odin. When it first appeared it was hinted that the Destroyer had been created as a weapon to face some dark menace from the stars. First seen in the Temple of Darkness in Asia, the Destroyer is used by Thor's arch-foe Loki against him. Animated by a nearby lifeforce, it battles Thor to a standstill, Loki is forced to intervene and stop the Destroyer using lethal force when Odin threatens to kill him. Thor then buries the armor under a mountain slide.

The armor is briefly used again by Loki in a failed bid to kill Odin, before being salvaged by Karnilla, Queen of the Norns, and animated by Thor's companion Sif, who attempted to use it to battle the villain the Wrecker when Thor was temporarily deprived of his godhood and powers. The Destroyer, however, attacks Thor, with the battle ending when Sif breaks her connection with it.

Thor later offers the armor to the World Devourer Galactus, in exchange for releasing his current Herald, Firelord. Galactus accepts, and the Destroyer acts as his Herald, detecting Counter-Earth for the entity before going on to battle the Fantastic Four. The Destroyer is finally recaptured for reuse by Loki.

When the menace from the stars is revealed to be the Celestials, Thor learns the Skyfather gods (Odin, Zeus, etc.) pooled their resources a millennium before to create the Destroyer as a weapon to stop the arrival of the so-called Fourth Host of Celestials. The Destroyer then draws the Odinsword, and together with the Uni-Mind confronts the Fourth Host. The Celestials, however, dissipate the Uni-Mind and melt the Destroyer armor into slag, scattering the life-forces of the Asgardians. The initiative of the Skymother goddesses pacifies the Celestials, and  Thor revives his people via Odin by using a fraction of the gathered power of the other Skyfathers.

Loki eventually finds the remains of the Destroyer and reforms it in a bid to destroy Thor, who has been reduced to pulp after a triumphant but destructive battle against the Midgard Serpent. The Destroyer, however, cannot kill Thor due to a curse induced by the Norse Queen of the dead, Hela which made his bones brittle and incapable of healing or dying. Thor wrests control of the armor from the host—an enthralled Frost Giant named Siggorth—through sheer force of will and goes on to defeat Loki. The Destroyer - depicted as thinking and speaking for the first time - tries to take back control from Thor but fails. Wearing Thor's raiment and wielding his hammer Mjolnir, the Destroyer confronts Hela and forces her to restore Thor to human form. The Destroyer is left in a crystal in Hela's realm, and is eventually animated by the goddess Lorelei. Lorelei battles several Asgardians and subsequently becomes trapped in the dimension of the Great Beasts.

The Destroyer is later deployed by trolls, who empower it with the spirit of the villain Maestro, an evil future version of the Hulk. Unable to physically stop the Destroyer, the Hulk enters the armor on the mental plane- exploiting the fact that the Maestro is still technically him and hence 'tricking' the Destroyer into absorbing his soul as well- and banishes the Maestro back to his weakened original body. Thor has two more encounters with the Destroyer, with the armor almost killing him on the first occasion and breaking his jaw on the second. The armor is eventually retrieved by Loki and occupied by the entity Desak, although Thor—equipped with the Odinpower—decapitates it with one throw of Mjolnir.

The Asgardian god Balder takes control of the armor when Thor was on a quest to locate his missing people, with villain Doctor Doom later using a copy of the Destroyer armor to attack the Asgardians.

After Thor loses the ability to wield Mjolnir, and the hammer is claimed by an unknown woman, Odin dispatches the Destroyer - animated by his brother Cull the Serpent - to reclaim it. Queen of the gods Frigga forces Odin to withdraw the Destroyer when she confronts him with the knowledge that he has essentially become the villain with his unprovoked attack.

Powers and abilities
The Destroyer is forged from an unknown and enchanted metal. The Destroyer armor possesses superhuman strength, stamina and is practically invulnerable. It is capable of energy projection, matter manipulation and when lowered the armor's visor can fire a disintegration beam.

Although the Destroyer can act independently for brief periods, the construct is typically lifeless until animated by the life-force of a sentient living being. Once animated, the Destroyer retains a rudimentary base personality that will eventually subvert the host unless the latter is a particularly strong-willed individual. Odin is also capable of casting a spell that can force the animating persona from the armor and deactivate it.

Other versions
 During the Secret Wars storyline, the villain the Maestro seeks the Destroyer armor, now guarded by the 'Ancient One', an elderly version of Rick Jones.

In other media

Television
 The Destroyer appears in the "Mighty Thor" segment of The Marvel Super Heroes.
 The Destroyer appears in The Avengers: Earth's Mightiest Heroes episode "Powerless".
 The Destroyer appears in the Ultimate Spider-Man episode "Itsy Bitsy Spider-Man".
 The Destroyer appears in Avengers Assemble, voiced by Maurice LaMarche (in "The Doomstroyer"), and by Jim Meskimen (in "A Friend in Need"). 
 The Destroyer appears in Guardians of the Galaxy.
 The Destroyer appears in Marvel Disk Wars: The Avengers.

Film
The Destroyer appears in Thor.

Video games
 The Destroyer appears as a boss in Marvel: Ultimate Alliance.
 The Destroyer armor is an unlockable costume for Thor in Thor: God of Thunder.
 The Destroyer appears as a boss and unlockable character in Marvel: Avengers Alliance.
 The Destroyer appears in Lego Marvel Super Heroes.
 The Destroyer appears as a playable character in Marvel: Future Fight.
 The Destroyer appears as a playable character in Lego Avengers.
 The Destroyer appears as a boss in Marvel Ultimate Alliance 3: The Black Order, voiced by Liam O'Brien.

Merchandise
 The Destroyer was included as a chase variant in the 15th wave of Toy Biz's 6" Marvel Legends action figure line.
 A figure of the Destroyer was released in wave 39 of the Marvel Minimates line.
 A figure of the Destroyer was released in the Battle for Asgard's Vault 3-pack from the Marvel Super Hero Squad line, packaged with figures of Thor and Loki.
 Two figures of the Destroyer were released in Hasbro's 3.75" Thor: The Mighty Avenger line. Additionally, an 8" figure was released in that same line.
 The popular strategy miniatures game HeroClix, by Wizkids Games, has featured the Destroyer in two of its sets, Hammer of Thor and the Avengers Movie set.
 Funko released a bobblehead for the Destroyer based on its appearance in the Thor film. It was only available in certain Bethany Beach, Delaware stores unboxed in mint condition.

References

External links
 Destroyer at Marvel.com

Fantasy weapons
Fictional armour
Marvel Comics characters with superhuman strength
Marvel Comics magical objects
Thor (Marvel Comics)